Hamand Kilan (also Romanized as Hamand Kīlān) is a village in Jamabrud Rural District, in the Central District of Damavand County, Tehran Province, Iran. At the 2006 census, its population was 12, in 8 families.

References 

Populated places in Damavand County